Veľká Tŕňa is a village and municipality in the Trebišov District in the Košice Region of south-eastern Slovakia.

History
In historical records the village was first mentioned in 1220.

Geography
The village lies at an altitude of 178 metres and covers an area of 14.115 km².
It has a population of about 480 people.

Ethnicity
The village is about 97% Slovak and 3% Hungarian.

Facilities
The village has a public library and a football pitch.

External links
https://web.archive.org/web/20080111223415/http://www.statistics.sk/mosmis/eng/run.html 

Villages and municipalities in Trebišov District